Benjamin Franklin Nutting ( – 1887) was an artist in Boston, Massachusetts, in the 19th century. He taught drawing in local schools, published do-it-yourself drawing instruction materials, and showed his artwork in several exhibitions.

Biography
Nutting graduated from the Boston Latin School in 1816. He began working as an artist in Boston around 1826, painting portraits, and also drawing "on stone for lithographers" such as Pendleton's Lithography (ca.1828-1833); Annin & Smith; and B.W. Thayer & Co.

He taught drawing at the Chauncy-Hall School; and the Roxbury Latin School (c. 1876). As a teacher and artist, he was associated with the Boston Artists' Association. He also worked as "an artist, drawing teacher and lithographer" for Francis Oakley in Boston, probably in the 1850s-1860s. In 1880, he taught drawing/painting on West Street.

Nutting showed frequently in art exhibitions. His work appeared at Boston's American Gallery of Fine Arts (1835); and the Boston Art Association (1844) Several of his paintings were displayed in 1851-1852 in the gallery of the New England Art Union. He exhibited 2 oil paintings in the 1847 exhibit of the Massachusetts Charitable Mechanic Association; and his watercolor "A New England Farm" was included in the association's 1884 exhibit. His watercolor "Apple Branch and Jug" was included in the 1880 exhibition of American Art at the Museum of Fine Arts, Boston.; and his watercolor "A New England Kitchen" was exhibited in the Lydian Gallery, Chicago, in 1880. He also showed works at the Boston Art Club (1873, 1875–1876).

Further reading
Works by Nutting
 
 
 
  ("This little book contains a series of sketches admirably arranged to aid the young pupil in acquiring the rudiments of the art of drawing, even without a teacher.")
Works about Nutting
John Keep Nutting. Nutting genealogy: A record of some of the descendants of John Nutting, of Groton, Mass. Syracuse, NY: C. W. Bardeen, 1908.
Jourdan Moore Houston. "M. J. Whipple's New England Scenery From Nature Series: A Yearbook of Tappan & Bradford Artists, 1849-1852." Imprint. Vol. 27, no. 2 (Autumn 2002), 27-44.

References

Images

External links

 WorldCat. Nutting, B. F. (Benjamin Franklin) 1803?-1887
American Antiquarian Society. Image of Nutting's Pioneer Drawing Cards (Boston: Higgins and Bradley, 1856)

Artists from Boston
American art educators
1803 births
1887 deaths
Year of birth uncertain
Boston Latin School alumni